Thesiger is a surname, and may refer to:

 Alfred Henry Thesiger (1838–1880), British jurist
 Ernest Thesiger (1879–1961), English stage and film actor
 Eric Thesiger (1874–1961), British soldier and Page of Honour to Queen Victoria
 Frederic Thesiger, 1st Baron Chelmsford (1794–1878), English jurist and politician 
 Frederic Thesiger, 2nd Baron Chelmsford (1827–1905), 2nd Baron Chelmsford; British general
 Frederic Thesiger, 1st Viscount Chelmsford (1868–1933), British statesman; Viceroy of India 
 George Thesiger (1868–1915), senior officer in the British Army 
 Gerald Thesiger (1902–1981), judge of the Queen's Bench Division of the High Court of England and Wales
 Wilfred Gilbert Thesiger (1871–1920), British officer and diplomat
 Wilfred Thesiger (1910–2003), British explorer and travel writer

See also
 Thesiger Bay, Northwest Territories, Canada